Francesco Zizola (born 1962) is an Italian photojournalist, based in Rome. His photographs have appeared in magazines and he has received numerous World Press Photo awards, including World Press Photo of the Year in 1996 and four Pictures of the Year International awards. He is a member of NOOR photo agency, which he co-founded.

Life and work
Zizola was born in Rome and studied anthropology. He began working as a professional photographer in 1981 and became a photojournalist in 1986. He is based in Rome.

He is a member of NOOR photo agency, which he co-founded in 2007.

Publications
Ruas. Abele, 1994. .
Etats d'Eenfances. Photo Poche, 1999. .
Born Somewhere. Delpire Editeurs; Fusi Orari, 2004. .
Iraq. Abele; Amnesty International, 2007. With a foreword by Pietro Veronese.
True Colours. NOOR 5. NOOR, 2012.

Documentary films about Zizola
Occhio Sensibile = Sensitive Eye (2006) – by Liliana Ginanneschi

Awards
1994: MIFAV prize, Best photographic book, Italy 
1995: First prize, People in the News Stories, World Press Photo, Amsterdam
1996: Visa d’Or, France
1997: First prize, People Stories, World Press Photo, Amsterdam
1997: World Press Photo of the Year, World Press Photo, Amsterdam
1997: Pictures of the Year International, USA
1998: Second prize, General News Stories, World Press Photo, Amsterdam
1998: First prize, General News, World Press Photo, Amsterdam
1998: Pictures of the Year International, USA
2000: Second prize, Eugene Smith contest, USA
2002: Second prize, Daily Life Stories, World Press Photo, Amsterdam
2003: Pictures of the Year International, USA
2004: Special Recognition Award, Alexia Foundation for World Peace, USA
2005: First prize, Portraits Singles, World Press Photo, Amsterdam
2005: Second Prize, National Press Photographers Association Best of Photojournalism, USA
2005: "Born Somewhere", Photo District News Best Book Selection
2006: Third place, Magazine Division / Portrait, Pictures of the Year International, USA
2006: Hansel-Mieth Prize 2005, Germany
2006: Photo District News Annual Web Winner
2007: Special Jury Prize (with seven others), Days Japan International Photojournalism Awards.
2008: Second prize, People in the News, Stories, World Press Photo, Amsterdam
2012: Third prize, Nature, Singles, World Press Photo, Amsterdam
2016: Second prize, Contemporary Issues, Stories, World Press Photo, Amsterdam

References

External links
 
 Zizola's page at NOOR Photographic Agency

1962 births
Living people
Italian photographers
Italian photojournalists